Simba FC is a football club from Rwanda.

The team currently plays in the Rwandan Second Division.

Performance in CAF competitions
2001 CAF Cup: 1 appearance First Round

References

Football clubs in Rwanda